South Korea competed at the 1988 Summer Paralympics in Seoul, South Korea. 227 competitors from South Korea won 94 medals including 40 gold, 35 silver and 19 bronze and finished 7th in the medal table.

See also 
 South Korea at the Paralympics
 South Korea at the 1988 Summer Olympics

References 

South Korea at the Paralympics
1988 in South Korean sport
Nations at the 1988 Summer Paralympics